Dongfu is a town in Haicang District, Xiamen, FJ.

Administration
The town executive, CPC sub-branch and PSB sub-station (paichusuo, 派出所) are in Dongpu Village.

Villages
 Dongpu (东埔) - town centre
 Shanbian 山边
 Zhaihou 寨后
 Guoban 过坂
 Dongyao 东瑶
 Dingmei 鼎美
 Houke 后柯
 Yunwei (芸尾)
 Fengshan 凤山
 Zhendai 贞岱
 Lianhua 莲花
 Hongtang 洪塘

Other
 Dongfu Orchard

Notes and references

Geography of Xiamen
Towns in Fujian